Mount Davidson is a  mountain summit located in the Garibaldi Ranges of the Coast Mountains, in Garibaldi Provincial Park of southwestern British Columbia, Canada. The Cheakamus Glacier lies between these two summits, and precipitation runoff from the peak and meltwater from the glacier drains into tributaries of the Cheakamus River. The first ascent of the mountain was made in 1929 by Neal M. Carter and Emmy Milledge. The mountain is named after Professor John Davidson (1878 – 1970), who contributed a large amount of botanical knowledge about Garibaldi Park. The mountain's name was officially adopted on September 2, 1930, by the Geographical Names Board of Canada.


Climate
Based on the Köppen climate classification, Mount Davidson is located in the marine west coast climate zone of western North America. Most weather fronts originate in the Pacific Ocean, and travel east toward the Coast Mountains where they are forced upward by the range (Orographic lift), causing them to drop their moisture in the form of rain or snowfall. As a result, the Coast Mountains experience high precipitation, especially during the winter months in the form of snowfall. Temperatures can drop below −20 °C with wind chill factors below −30 °C. The months July through September offer the most favorable weather for climbing Mount Davidson.

See also

 Geography of British Columbia
 Geology of British Columbia

References

External links
 
 Weather: Mountain Forecast

Garibaldi Ranges
Two-thousanders of British Columbia
Pacific Ranges
Sea-to-Sky Corridor
New Westminster Land District